Avagraha is a symbol used to indicate prodelision of an  in many Indian languages like Sanskrit as shown below. It is usually transliterated with an apostrophe in Roman script and, in case of Devanagari, as in the Sanskrit philosophical expression  , which is a sandhi of ( + ) ‘I am Shiva’.

In the case of Hindi, the character is also sometimes used as a symbol to denote long or heavy syllables, in metrical poetry.  For example, the syllables in the word   ‘metre’ (in nominative) can be denoted as "", meaning two long syllables.  (Cf. other notations in entry "Systems of scansion".)

Avagraha in Unicode
The avagraha symbol is encoded at several Unicode points, for various Brahmic scripts that use it.

References

Brahmic diacritics